Malacorhinus is a genus of skeletonizing leaf beetles in the family Chrysomelidae. There are about 30 described species in Malacorhinus. They are found in North America and the Neotropics.

In Australia, the species Malacorhinus irregularis was introduced to Northern Territory in 2000 as a biological control agent against the weed Mimosa pigra.

Species
These 10 species belong to the genus Malacorhinus:
 Malacorhinus acaciae (Schaeffer, 1906)
 Malacorhinus apicalis Jacoby, 1887
 Malacorhinus biplagiatus Jacoby, 1887
 Malacorhinus decempunctatus Jacoby, 1887
 Malacorhinus dilaticornis Jacoby, 1887
 Malacorhinus exclamationis Jacoby, 1892
 Malacorhinus foveipennis (Jacoby, 1879)
 Malacorhinus irregularis (Jacoby, 1887)
 Malacorhinus knullorum Wilcox, 1951
 Malacorhinus tilghmani Mignot, 1970 (replacement name for Malacorhinus tripunctatus (Jacoby, 1879))

References

Further reading

 
 
 
 

Galerucinae
Chrysomelidae genera
Articles created by Qbugbot
Taxa named by Martin Jacoby